The Balance of Payments Manual published by the International Monetary Fund provides accounting standards for balance of payments reporting and analysis for many countries. The Bureau of Economic Analysis adheres to this standard.
  
The sixth edition was released in prepublication form in December 2008. Its title has been amended to Balance of Payments and International Investment Position Manual to reflect that it covers not only transactions, but also the stocks of the related financial assets and liabilities.

Together with the manual IMF has published an accompanying document Balance of Payments and International Investment Position Compilation Guide providing practical advice on the topics of the manual.

See also 
Balance of payments

External links
Balance of Payments and International Investment Position Manual, sixth edition – International Monetary Fund
Balance of Payments and International Investment Position Compilation Guide (BPM6 CG) – International Monetary Fund
Balance of Payments Manual, fifth edition – International Monetary Fund
Balance of Payments Textbook – International Monetary Fund

International finance
International trade